Vladimír Špaček (born October 29, 1939) is a Czechoslovak sprint canoer who competed in the early 1960s. At the 1960 Summer Olympics in Rome, he was disqualified in the heats of the K-1 4 × 500 m event.

References
Sports-reference.com profile

1939 births
Canoeists at the 1960 Summer Olympics
Czechoslovak male canoeists
Living people
Olympic canoeists of Czechoslovakia